Mahesh Raj Soni is an Indian craftsman specialising in the traditional art of Thewa, a Rajasthani jewellery making tradition using glass and gold leaves and is one of the surviving exponents of the art form which has roots in Pratapgarh, Rajasthan. He is a member of Rajasthan Thewa Kala Sansthan and has featured in the Limca Book of World Records in its 2011 edition. Soni, who is a cancer survivor, was honoured by the Government of India in 2015 with Padma Shri, the fourth highest Indian civilian award.

See also

 Thewa

References

Recipients of the Padma Shri in arts
Living people
People from Pratapgarh district, Rajasthan
Indian goldsmiths
Year of birth missing (living people)